Lahaye is a French surname. Notable people with the surname include:

Damien Lahaye (born 1984), Belgian footballer
Jean-Luc Lahaye (born 1952), French singer, television presenter and writer
Matthieu Lahaye (born 1984), French racing driver
Paul Lahaye (1902–1983), Canadian politician
Tim LaHaye (1926–2016), American evangelical Christian minister and author 
Tristan Lahaye (born 1983), French footballer

See also
Mount Lahaye, a mountain of Antarctica

French-language surnames